Tasmantrix nigrocornis is a moth of the family Micropterigidae. It is known from eastern Australia, in coastal rainforests of southern New South Wales from Mount Keira to Mount Dromedary.

The forewing length is 3.4 mm for males. The forewing ground colour has a strong purple iridescence. There are two shining white fasciae in the basal half with scattered indistinct white streaks apically. The first is a basal costal streak from the middle of the wing to about one quarter, it is extremity tapered to the anal side and proximally contiguous with the white dorsum of the head when at rest. The second is a strong transverse band, of more or less constant width, at mid length. There are irregular patches and lines of white scales in the apical quarter, especially between veins along the costa and the termen and along veins within the vicinity of the radial and medial vein forks. The fringes are black and white tipped. The hindwing is uniformly dark grey with bronzy iridescence. The fringes are dark grey.

Etymology
The species name is derived from the Latin niger- (meaning black) and -cornis (meaning horned) with reference to the striking black antennae of this species.

References

Micropterigidae
Moths described in 2010